Cartonplast is a trademark that was first given by Covema spa (Italy) in the early seventies to a  specific model of extrusion line manufactured and sold world wide by the aforesaid.

In subsequent years such name was used as well to identify the product made by a Cartonplast extrusion line that is to say plastic corrugated sheet as well known as plastic hollow profile sheet or plastic twin wall sheet. The main raw material used to manufacture Cartonplast sheets are PP (polypropylene) and PET (Polyethylene terephthalate).

The Cartonplast extrusion is carried out by using a unique front spinneret plate applied to a flat T-die equipped with restrictor bar (this technology was invented and patented by Marco Terragni during the seventies) to enable using thermoplastic polymers with different MFI (range 0.9 to 3).

History 

Marco Terragni started to work on this technology in 1970 with an engineering team of Riap spa and he patented it in 1974. In the year 1991 there was big development of this technology when Y.C. Wang of Formosa Plastics Corp, of Taiwan, was meeting Terragni and discussing with him the foundation of the biggest Cartonplast factory worldwide to be installed in Lolita, Texas.  In 1992 Wang and Terragni signed deal for the supply of 15 Cartonplast extrusion lines for the Lolita Plant (Inteplast Group) that still today is manufacturing Cartonplast sheets under the registered trade name of Intepro or Coroplast.
Cartonplast extrusion lines are still today manufactured by company Agripak S.r.l of Milan, Italy.

Cartonplast feature 
Cartonplast sheets is lightweight (hollow structure), non-toxic, waterproof, shockproof, long-lasting material that resists corrosion. Compared with cardboard, Cortoplast has the advantages of being waterproof and colorfast.

The Cartonplast composition can be altered to add anti-static properties using the masterbatch technique. This particular masterbatch produces a conductive, anti-static plastic hollow board sheet. (Conductive plate surface resistivity can be controlled between 103 ≈105; anti-static sheet surface resistivity can be controlled between 106 ≈1011.)

Applications 
Cartonplast is sturdy, light, resilient, and inexpensive, making it ideal for the fabrication of reusable plastic boxes, reusable box pallets, reusable payer pads, partitions walls, facades, beam forms, advertising panels, point of sales and many others among which even small boats.

Modifying cartonplast sheets 
Cartonplast sheets can be modified by adding foaming agents, colors, anti UV, antistatic additives and flame retardant.

See also 
 Covema
 Corrugated plastic

External links 
 Official Gazette of the United States Patent and Trademark Office: Trademark.Official Gazette of the United States Patent and Trademark Office: Trademarks
 Cartonplast Sheet Extrusion Lines.Hollow Profile Sheet | Plastic Processing Machinery | AGRIPAK
 CartonPlast patent.Extruder and sizer apparatus for hollow plastic sections
 Official Gazette of the United States Patent and Trademark Office: Trademarks.Official Gazette of the United States Patent and Trademark Office: Trademarks
 Plastics Technology, Volume 24,Edizioni 1-6.Plastics Technology
 Pira Packaging Abstracts, Volume 37.Packaging Abstracts
 Kenya Gazette 19 lug 1974.Kenya Gazette
 Official website of Cartonplast LLC.Cartonplast® | Karton
 Cartonplast, Modern Plastic International, 1999.
 Marco Terragni, Modern Plastic International, 1998.
 Pira Packaging Abstracts, Volume 37.
 Orquideología, Volumi 10-14.
 AY Harris Indiana Industrial Directory.
 Manuale dell'operatore socio-sanitario. Fondamenti di assistenza alla persona
Di Luca Cecchetto, Gianluigi Romeo.
 Giornale della libreria, Volume 78,Edizioni 1-14.
 Growing Wisconsin's Economy: A Job Creation Report : Forward Wisconsin Successful Business Attraction Projects, 1987-2004.
 Vida apícola, Edizioni 61-67, 1993.
 The World, 2008.
 Markenblatt, Volume 5, Edizioni 15-17.
 Playing area module comprising several elastically deformable panels maintained in a curved configuration, and corresponding panel Frederic Saunier, Romain Guerif, Herve Degauchy.
 Cartonplast article.
 Fabrication of High–Strength Alumina Composite Foams Through Gel–CastingElham Sheikhi, Sanaz Naghibi JOURNAL OF ADVANCED MATERIALS AND PROCESSING (JOURNAL OF MATERIALS SCIENCE) 4 (4), 46-55, 2016.
 The responses of enzymatic and non-enzymatic antioxidant systems of scion on different rootstocks under water stress deficit Maryam Keshavarzi, Akhtar Shekafandeh Advances in Horticultural Science 33 (2), 161-170, 2019.
 Indirect evaporative cooling apparatus Barry R Brooks, Dan L Field US Patent 6,523,604, 2003.
 Chilled packing systems for fruit flies (Diptera: Tephritidae) in the Sterile Insect Technique Emilio Hernández, Arseny Escobar, Bigail Bravo, Pablo Montoya Neotropical entomology 39 (4), 601-607, 2010.
 Official Gazette of the United States Patent and ..., Volume 974, Edizioni 1-2, Di United States. Patent and Trademark Office.

References 

Plastics
Plastic brands
Packaging materials
Brand name materials